Anthropological Forum (AF) is a scientific journal in anthropology and comparative sociology. It was founded in 1963 by Ronald Berndt: at the University of Western Australia and is sponsored by the Berndt Museum of Anthropology in Perth. In its early years of existence, it published widely on Aboriginal Australian issues, but has since developed to include anthropological studies of all cultural and geographical areas as well as on a wide range of theoretical issues. 

Successive editors were Ronald Berndt (1963–1985), followed by John Gordon (1988–2000) and Robert Tonkinson (2000–2011). In addition, the journal has Mitchell Low as Associate Editor and Sean Martin-Iverson as Book Review Editor.

Abstracting and indexing 
The journal is abstracted and indexed in:

According to the Journal Citation Reports, the journal has a 2017 impact factor of 1.000, ranking 38 out of 85 in the category "Anthropology". According to SJR (Scimago Journal & Country Rank), it has a H Index of 17.

References 

Anthropology journals
Publications established in 1963
English-language journals